Progress M-19M, identified by NASA as Progress 51P, is a Progress spacecraft used by Roskosmos to resupply the International Space Station during 2013. Progress M-19M was launched on a standard 2-day rendezvous profile towards the ISS. The 19th Progress-M 11F615A60 spacecraft to be launched, it had the serial number 419 and was built by RKK Energia.

Launch
The spacecraft was launched on time at 10:12:16 UTC on 24 April 2013 by a Soyuz-U carrier rocket flying from Site 1/5 at the Baikonur Cosmodrome in Kazakhstan.

The Progress spacecraft made it safely to orbit and deployed its solar arrays as planned. However one of the spacecraft's Kurs antenna, used for approach and docking, failed to deploy at the scheduled time.

Docking

Progress M-19M achieved soft docking with the ISS on April 26 at 12:25 UTC to the back docking port of the Zvezda Service Module, and hard docking was complete at 12:26:18 UTC. Due to the failure of the deployment of one of the spacecraft's Kurs antenna, a software patch was sent up from Russian controllers to bypass restrictions on the Kurs approach. The manual TORU system on standby with cosmonauts Roman Romanenko and Pavel Vinogradov on the controls in case of a Kurs failure. In the end the automated rendezvous and docking operation procedures using the Kurs docking system aboard the ISS and the Progress was used, although the docking velocity was slower than normal to give engineers a good look at the antenna through the station's camera system.

The Expedition 35 crew opened the hatches and entered the Progress later on the day.

Cargo

Undocking and decay
Progress M-19M undocked from Zvezda module of the ISS on 11 June 2013 at 13:58 UTC. The undocking paved the way for European Space Agency's ATV-4 Albert Einstein to subsequently dock with the ISS.

Soon after the undocking, Progress M-19M entered an independent orbit to begin a one-week free flight and conducted the Radar-Progress experiment. The goal of the Radar-Progress experiment (also conducted on previous Progress flights) is to investigate the density, size and reflectivity of the ionosphere environment around the spacecraft due to engine burns. During the experiment, the spacecraft was tracked by the Institute of Solar Terrestrial Physics Siberian Branch of the Russian Academy of Sciences in Irkutsk.

At the end Radar-Progress experiment, on 19 June 2013 at 13:39 UTC, Progress M-19M performed a deorbit burn maneuver using the S5.80 engine of the RTDU-80 main propulsion system. The mission came to an end when the cargo ship performed destructive re-entry and plunged into the Pacific Ocean at 14:40 UTC, on 19 June 2013.

References

External links
 Institute of Solar Terrestrial Physics

Progress (spacecraft) missions
Spacecraft launched in 2013
Spacecraft which reentered in 2013
Spacecraft launched by Soyuz-U rockets
Supply vehicles for the International Space Station